Jasper Philipsen (born 2 March 1998) is a Belgian professional cyclist, who currently rides for UCI ProTeam .

Career
In July 2019, he was named in the startlist for the 2019 Tour de France. In October 2020, he was named in the startlist for the 2020 Vuelta a España, where he won stage 15. He participated in his second Tour de France in 2021 and while he did not win any stages he had many promising results including finishing on the stage podium a half dozen times. He rode in the 2021 Vuelta a España where he won two stages. He also wore the points classification jersey on several stages, being involved in a battle with Fabio Jakobsen for the jersey, before  he decided it had been a successful race and chose to abandon about halfway through due to a mild fever.

Early in the 2022 season he won the points classification and two stages of the UAE Tour. He then won the points classification and a stage in the Tour of Turkey and a stage in the Tour of Belgium.

He entered the 2022 Tour de France with the team targeting stage wins with both Philipsen and Matthew van der Poel. Philipsen initially thought that he won stage 4, but it turned out Wout Van Aert had surprised the peloton and attacked while wearing the yellow jersey. After the Alps he got a chance to win stage 15 after the final breakaway rider had been caught inside the final kilometre. He was able to outcharge previous stage winners Van Aert and Mads Pedersen to take the team's first win of the race. After the stage Tadej Pogačar came over to the private team area away from the press and crowds to congratulate him on his first career Tour win. His second stage win came on the final day in Paris where he convincingly out-sprinted the others fighting for the stage win.

Major results

2015
 1st  Time trial, National Junior Road Championships
2016
 1st  Time trial, National Junior Road Championships
 1st E3 Harelbeke Junioren
 1st Guido Reybrouck Classic
2017
 1st  Overall Le Triptyque des Monts et Châteaux
1st Stage 2
 1st Paris–Tours Espoirs
 Giro Ciclistico d'Italia
1st  Points classification
1st Stage 4
 1st Stage 2 Tour Alsace
 1st Stage 5 Olympia's Tour
 2nd Ronde van Vlaanderen Beloften
 2nd ZLM Tour
2018
 1st  Overall Le Triptyque des Monts et Châteaux
1st  Points classification
1st Stages 1 & 2
 1st Gylne Gutuer
 1st Stage 4 Tour of Utah
 1st Stage 3 Giro Ciclistico d'Italia
 3rd Three Days of Bruges–De Panne
 4th Tour de l'Eurométropole
 4th Paris–Roubaix Espoirs
 5th Dorpenomloop Rucphen
 6th Grote Prijs Jef Scherens
 7th Grand Prix d'Isbergues
 8th Primus Classic
 9th Lillehammer GP
2019
 1st Stage 5 Tour Down Under
 2nd Grand Prix de Fourmies
 2nd Heistse Pijl
 3rd Nokere Koerse
 3rd Elfstedenronde
 3rd Brussels Cycling Classic
 5th Dwars door het Hageland
 6th Overall Tour of Belgium
 9th Scheldeprijs
2020
 1st Stage 15 Vuelta a España
 1st Stage 1 BinckBank Tour
 1st Stage 3 Tour du Limousin
 1st  Sprints classification, Tour Down Under
 5th Scheldeprijs
 5th Brussels Cycling Classic
 9th Druivenkoers Overijse
2021
 1st  Kampioenschap van Vlaanderen
 1st Eschborn–Frankfurt
 1st Scheldeprijs
 1st Grand Prix de Denain
 1st Paris–Chauny
 Vuelta a España
1st Stages 2 & 5
Held  after Stages 2–3, 5–7
 Tour of Turkey
1st  Points classification
1st Stages 6 & 7
 2nd Classic Brugge–De Panne
2022
 1st Omloop van het Houtland
 1st Paris–Bourges
 Tour de France
1st Stages 15 & 21 
 UAE Tour
1st  Points classification
1st Stages 1 & 5
 Tour of Turkey
1st  Points classification
1st Stage 3
 1st Stage 4 Danmark Rundt
 2nd Münsterland Giro
 2nd Gooikse Pijl
 3rd Road race, National Road Championships
 4th Druivenkoers Overijse
 6th BEMER Cyclassics
 6th Rund um Köln 
 6th Grand Prix de Wallonie
 8th Overall Tour of Belgium
1st Stage 2
 8th Scheldeprijs
2023
 Tirreno–Adriatico
1st Stages 3 & 7

Grand Tour general classification results timeline

References

External links

1998 births
Living people
Belgian male cyclists
People from Mol, Belgium
Cyclists from Antwerp Province
Belgian Tour de France stage winners
Belgian Vuelta a España stage winners
21st-century Belgian people